Joanna Shuni Butterfield,  (born 19 March 1979) is a British parasport athlete who competes in the F51 club and discus throw. In 2014 Butterfield set a European record in the club while winning the event at the 2014 IPC Athletics European Championships. The following year she added the World title at the 2015 IPC Athletics World Championships in Qatar, securing a place at the 2016 Paralympic Games.

Personal history
Butterfield was born in Yorkshire, England in 1979, but later moved to Glasgow in Scotland. In 2011, she was diagnosed with a spinal tumor which resulted in her being paralysed below the waist.

Sports career
During her rehabilitation at a spinal unit in Glasgow, Butterfield was introduced to the sport of wheelchair rugby. In early 2012 she joined the Caledonian Crushers, and later became their vice-captain.

In 2014 Butterfield was classified as a F51 disability athlete and began competing in regional meets in both the discus and club throw events. In August that year she was selected for the Great Britain team to compete at the 2014 IPC Athletics European Championships. There she competed in the F32/51 club throw, and set a new European record with a distance of 17.68m winning gold in all British podium alongside Josie Pearson and Gemma Prescott. That season she also competed at the SDS Championships in Perth and threw personal bests in both the discus (9.79m) and the club (19.50m), winning gold in both events.

The following year Butterfield travelled to Dubai to take part in the Fazaa International, the first IPC Grand Prix of the year. In the F32/33/51 discus she threw 8.87m to win the competition and beat the previous F51 European record by 27 centimetres. She also improved on her European record in the club with a throw of 19.69 which saw her take gold. In July Butterfield competed in her third IPC Grand Prix of the year, held at Olympic Park in London. A throw of 21.50 in the club not only gave her the title, but improved on her European title to take her within 40 cm of American Rachael Morrison's world record. Morrison was Butterfield's main rival when the two met at the 2015 IPC Athletics World Championships in Doha. In the club Butterfield threw 21.44 to set a championship record and push her American rival into silver medal place. But it was Morrison on top when they met a few days later in the T52 discus throw, with Butterfield coming third behind Morrison and Mexico's Leticia Ochoa Delgado. Though Butterfield's distance of 8.96m was a new European record for a F51 athlete.

Butterfield was appointed Member of the Order of the British Empire (MBE) in the 2017 New Year Honours for services to field athletics.

In June 2021 she was among the first dozen athletes chosen to represent the UK at the postponed 2020 Paralympics in Tokyo.

References

External links
 

1979 births
Living people
Sportspeople from Bristol
British female discus throwers
Track and field athletes with disabilities
Sportswomen with disabilities
British disabled sportspeople
Scottish disabled sportspeople
British female club throwers
Scottish Paralympic competitors
Sportspeople from Glasgow
Members of the Order of the British Empire
People with paraplegia
Medalists at the 2016 Summer Paralympics
Paralympic medalists in athletics (track and field)
Paralympic gold medalists for Great Britain
Athletes (track and field) at the 2016 Summer Paralympics
Paralympic athletes of Great Britain
Athletes (track and field) at the 2020 Summer Paralympics